Rumble of Thunder is the second studio album by the Hu, released by Better Noise Music on 2 September 2022. The album was announced on 8 July 2022 upon the release of the single "Black Thunder".

Track listing 
Music, lyrics and production by B. Dashdondog aka Dashka.

Personnel 
The Hu
 B. Enkhsaikhan aka "Enkush" – gal morin khuur
 Ts. Galbadrakh aka "Gala" – ayanga morin khuur, throat singing
 G. Nyamjantsan aka "Jaya" – tumur khuur, Tsuur, throat singing
 N. Temuulen aka "Temka" – baigali tovshuur, programming
 A. Jambaldorj "Jamba" – Mongolian guitarist, recording
 B. Nyamdavaa "Davaa" – electric guitarist, bass guitar
 G. Odbayar "Odko" – drums
 M. Unumunkh "Unu" – hengereg percussion

Production
 B. Temuujin – creative manager
 B. Dashdondog aka "Dashka" (Dashka Productions, Ulaanbaatar) – programming, recording
 A. Erkhemtuguldur aka "Erkhemee" (GV Studio, Ulaanbaatar) – drum recording
 Jerry Chua (MYX Music Studios, Singapore) – mixing
 Howie Weinberg (Weinberg Mastering, Los Angeles) – mastering

Charts

References 

2022 albums
The Hu albums
Eleven Seven Label Group albums